Carlos Roberto Rocha Gallo (born 4 March 1956), known as Carlos, is a Brazilian former footballer who played as a goalkeeper. He competed in the men's tournament at the 1976 Summer Olympics and won a gold medal in football at the 1975 Pan American Games.

Club career
In a club career which spanned from 1974 to 1993, Carlos Gallo played for Ponte Preta, Corinthians, Atlético Mineiro, Guarani, Palmeiras, Portuguesa and Malatyaspor (1988–1989) in Turkey. He won two Brazilian Silver Ball Awards.

International career
At international level, Carlos Gallo played 44 matches for the Brazilian national team, between 1976 and June 1993, and was selected for the 1978, 1982 and 1986 FIFA World Cup tournaments, playing in the latter edition of the competition. He conceded only one goal in the five World Cup games Brazil played in 1986.

References

External links
 
 
 Carlos at CBF 
 
 
 

1956 births
Living people
Footballers from São Paulo (state)
Brazilian footballers
Brazil international footballers
Association football goalkeepers
1978 FIFA World Cup players
1982 FIFA World Cup players
1986 FIFA World Cup players
1979 Copa América players
1987 Copa América players
1993 Copa América players
Footballers at the 1976 Summer Olympics
Olympic footballers of Brazil
Süper Lig players
Campeonato Brasileiro Série A players
Brazilian expatriate footballers
Brazilian expatriate sportspeople in Turkey
Expatriate footballers in Turkey
Associação Atlética Ponte Preta players
Sport Club Corinthians Paulista players
Malatyaspor footballers
Clube Atlético Mineiro players
Guarani FC players
Sociedade Esportiva Palmeiras players
Associação Portuguesa de Desportos players
Pan American Games medalists in football
Pan American Games gold medalists for Brazil
Footballers at the 1975 Pan American Games
Medalists at the 1975 Pan American Games